George J. McKenna III (born September 6, 1940) is an American politician and former educator who is a current member of the Los Angeles Unified School District Board of Education for District 1 since 2014. A former principal at Washington Preparatory High School, McKenna helped reform the school as the school had issues with gang violence, with his actions being re-enacted in the 1986 biographical film The George McKenna Story where he was portrayed by Denzel Washington.

Early life and education 
McKenna was born in New Orleans, Louisiana on September 6, 1940 and attended Xavier University, getting a Bachelor of Mathematics and later a Doctor of Education. In 1962, he accepted a teaching position for the Los Angeles Unified School District while attending Loyola Law School, the University of California, Los Angeles, and California State University, Los Angeles.

Career

High school principal and film 
After arriving to Los Angeles, McKenna was a math teacher and was assigned as principal of Washington High School. The school was plagued by low achievement score, high absenteeism and gang violence. Under McKenna's leadership, the school banned school violence and had low absentee rates. Because of his efforts, a biographical television film was made documenting his story called The George McKenna Story, with Denzel Washington portraying him.

In 1989, McKenna received the Congressional Black Caucus’ Chairman’s Award and was later inducted into the National Alliance of Black School Educators’ Hall of Fame in 1997.

Superintendent of schools 
In 1988, McKenna was hired to become the Inglewood Unified School District superintendent. After his hiring, McKenna was criticized by opponents for being arrogant and mismanaged the district. In 1993, Inglewood's school board then announced that they would not renew the contract between them and McKenna, with the board voting 3-2 for no confidence. In 1994, Compton Unified School District hired McKenna as deputy superintendent.

Board of Education 

In August 2014, McKenna announced that he was running for the LAUSD Board of Education District 1 seat to finish Marguerite LaMotte's term as LaMotte had died in December 2013. LaMotte, like McKenna, had also been a principal at Washington Preparatory High, and McKenna and supporters had previously pressured the Board to appoint him after her death, with the Board instead choosing to hold a special election. Although opponent Alex Johnson accused him of child molestation charges and the state take-over of the Compton and Inglewood school districts, widely condemned by supporters including Congresswomen Maxine Waters and Karen Bass, McKenna won the seat. McKenna was sworn in on August 28, 2014, and was re-elected in the 2014 general election.

References 

1940 births
Living people
21st-century American politicians
School board members in California
Xavier University alumni
Educators from Louisiana
21st-century American educators
20th-century American educators
African-American educators